Lokal may refer to:

 Kanal Lokal, Swedish TV channel
 Berliner Lokal-Anzeiger, German newspaper
 Lokal (Swiss brand), a brand of food from Manor (department store)

See also
 Lokal express, Luxembourg newspaper
 Local (disambiguation)